Ben Kealey is the former English touring keyboardist for the rock band Kasabian. He was born in Leicester, England.

Career

Kasabian
Kealey was the drummer in the band in its original format, when the band was still called Saracuse. In 2006, he rejoined the band (now named Kasabian) as the keyboard and synth player. In 2009, he became a permanent touring member of Kasabian, although he is not involved with most of the promotional work that the band does. He is credited on the band's albums West Ryder Pauper Lunatic Asylum (2009), Velociraptor! (2011) and 48:13 (2014).

Film soundtracks
Kealey has played piano or other instruments on the soundtracks to several films, including London Boulevard and I Give It a Year.

Personal life
As well as being a Grade 8 pianist, Kealey is also a contemporary artist completing a number of pieces so far which concentrate on urban art painted pianos and bicycles. Kealey writes poetry, music and sketches.

In April 2013, a piano designed by Kealey was unveiled as part of an urban art project at the Curve Theatre in Leicester.

Equipment
Kealey utilises a Hammond B200 organ, Muse receptor rack modules triggered by Novation controller keyboards and a Korg microkorg synth. He uses an Electro Harmonix Memory man delay pedal, a Boss digital delay/echo pedal and an Ibanez distortion pedal.

References

External links
Ben Kealey Urban Artwork
TMF meets Ben Kealey

1981 births
Living people
English people of Irish descent
English rock keyboardists
People from Leicester
Musicians from Leicestershire